The PZL Bielsko SZD-52 is a Polish single-seat standard class sailplane produced by PZL Bielsko. It is a cantilever high-wing monoplane with a T-tail and has a retractable main landing gear and a fixed tailwheel. The wings have integral water ballast tanks.

Variants
SZD-52 Jantar 15
SZD-52-1 Jantar 15SI
SZD-52-2 Krokus
SZD-52-3 Krokus S
SZD-52-4 Krokus C

Specifications (SZD52-3)

See also

References

Notes

SZD52
1980s Polish sailplanes
Aircraft first flown in 1981
SZD aircraft